Dino Attanasio (real name Edoardo Attanasio, born 8 May 1925) is a Belgian author of comics.

Biography
Attanasio was born in Milan.

After studies at the Academy of Arts of Milan, Dino Attanasio started to work in illustration and animation in the 1940s. He moved to Belgium in 1948 with his brother Gianni, also an artist. Shortly after his arrival, the young artist got in contact with Tintin magazine, for which he drew some illustrations, and decided to devote himself to comics. In the 1950s, he published Criche e Croc in the Italian magazine Il Giornalino and  Fanfan et Polo in La Libre Belgique with scripts by Jean-Michel Charlier and then René Goscinny. At that time, he also worked for Spirou magazine with some contributions to Les Belles Histoires de l'Oncle Paul. In 1954, he published  "Pastis et Dynamite" in Line with Greg.

He became popular in the late 1950s and 1960s thanks to The Adventures of Signor Spaghetti, a comic series he created with Goscinny, published in Tintin after 1957.
From 1959 à 1962 he published in Femmes d'aujourd'hui the comics series version of Les Aventures de Bob Morane, a series of novels written by Henri Vernes and for which he made some illustrations and art covers in the Marabout Junior collection. However, he is replaced for this job by Gérald Forton. Then, from 1959 to 1968, he took over the series Modeste et Pompon, originally created by Franquin.

After his departure from Tintin in 1968, Attanasio started working for the Dutch market, creating the series Johnny Goodbye with Martin Lodewijk and Patty Klein for Eppo and Pep, with   Bandoneon (with Delporte) in Pep and with De Macaroni's (with Dick Matena), but also for Italian magazines  with "Ambroise et Gino" in Corriere dei piccoli. From 1974 to 1986 he took on the Spaghetti series again in Formule 1, published in albums by Archers. In 1991 Attanasio created a comic adaptation of Boccaccio's literary classic Decameron with his son, published by Lefrancq. In 1994, he took over the series Bob Morane for one story only. Since then, new works have made rarer and some have publishers rediscovered some of his works, as Carnets de route in 1999 by Point Image and  since 2002 some shorts stories originally published in Tintin, by Loup.

Publications

Bob Morane (5 tomes, edited by Marabout) 1960–1963
Bob Morane: Les tours de cristal 1961
Modeste et Pompon (11 tomes) 1964–1968
Spaghetti (24 tomes) 1961–2001
Ambroise et Gino (1 tome) 1979
Bandonéon (2 tomes) 1979
Flash-back et la 4e dimension (1 tome)	1979
Soleil des damnés (Le) (1 tome) 1983
Il était une fois dans l'oued (1 tome) 1984
Bob Morane (1 tome, edited by Deligne) 1979
Johnny Goodbye (7 tomes) 1979–2004
Bob Morane (Divers, 6 tomes) 1985–2007
Bob Morane (edited by Lefrancq, 7 tomes) 1989–1995
Décaméron (Le) (1 tome) 1991
Fanfan et Polo (1 tome) 1991
Jimmy Stone (1 tome) 1997
Attanasio (3 tomes) 1999–2006
Bd story (2 tomes) 2002
Meilleurs récits de... (Les) (4 tomes) 2002–2006
Candida (1 tome) 2006

External links
 Biography at Lambiek's Comiclopedia
 Interview about Bob Morane.

1925 births
Writers from Milan
Belgian comics writers
Belgian comics artists
Artists from Milan
Belgian humorists
Living people
Italian emigrants to Belgium
Articles containing video clips